The God Box (stylized as #TheGodBox) is the sixth solo studio album by American rapper and record producer David Banner from Mississippi. It was released on May 19, 2017 via A Banner Vision. It features guest appearances from Raheem DeVaughn, WatchTheDuck, Big K.R.I.T., Big Rube, Black Thought, Cee-Lo Green, Devon Lewow, Kap G, Kenya Jori, Tim Wise, Rudy Currence and Tito Lo.

Track listing

Charts

References

External links

2017 albums
David Banner albums
Albums produced by DJ Khalil
Albums produced by David Banner
Albums produced by Street Symphony